The women's heptathlon event at the 2019 European Athletics U23 Championships was held in Gävle, Sweden, at Gavlehof Stadium Park on 11 and 12 July.

Records
Prior to the competition, the records were as follows:

Results

Final standings

References

Heptathlon
Combined events at the European Athletics U23 Championships